Broadsides is a 1983 videogame that simulated naval combat in the Age of Sail for the Atari 8-bit family, Apple II, and Commodore 64.

Giant warships circled each other, waiting for the best time to unleash a broadside upon the enemy. Cannons could be loaded with various types of ordnance; cannonballs to destroy the hull, chain shot to destroy the sails, and grapeshot to kill the enemy crew.

One could also close with the enemy ship and attempt to board their ship. This aspect of the game played a lot like rock-paper-scissors, where the player controlled one crew member and which sort of attack he made with his sword. This was compared against the enemy attack, and the results were used to decrease the crew count on one side. Once one side's crew was all dead, the other side was the victor.

The game also offers a simplified, arcade-combat mode in which the player fights an endless number of enemy ships.

Reception
Computer Gaming World in 1983 stated that Broadsides "is an excellent depiction of ship-to-ship combat". It cited the "superb" combat display, good graphics, user-designed scenarios, and the choice of tactical or arcade combat as highlights. In 1990 the magazine gave the game five out of five stars, stating that it had "vast entertainment value" and "remains the standard". In 1993 the magazine gave it three-plus stars, stating that "it remains the standard ... this writer still plays it on an Atari 800".

References

External links
 Atari manual for the game (HTML)

1983 video games
Apple II games
Atari 8-bit family games
Commodore 64 games
Naval video games
Strategy video games
Strategic Simulations games
Video games developed in the United States